The Bell 430 is an American/Canadian twin-engine light-medium helicopter built by Bell Helicopter. It is a stretched and more powerful development of the Bell 230, which, in turn, was based on the earlier Bell 222.

Development
While developing the reengined Model 222 as the 230, Bell began preliminary design work on a stretched derivative with a four-bladed main rotor in 1991. The Bell 430 was formally launched in February 1992, with two prototypes modified from Bell 230s. The first of these flew in its new configuration on October 25, 1994, and the second prototype, featuring the full 430 avionics suite, first flew on December 19, 1994.

Production of the Bell 230 ended in August 1995, and 430 production began.  The first 430 production aircraft was completed later that year. Canadian certification was awarded on February 23, 1996.  Deliveries began in mid-1996.

On January 24, 2008, Bell announced plans to terminate production of its Model 430 after order commitments were fulfilled in 2008.  Production ended after 136 helicopters were completed, with the last being delivered in May 2008.

Design

The Bell 430 features several significant improvements over the 230, the most significant of these being the new four-blade, bearingless, hingeless, composite main rotor. Although both the 230 and 430 are powered by Rolls-Royce (Allison) 250 turboshaft engines, the 430's engines are 10% more powerful. Other changes include the 1 ft 6 in (46 cm) stretched fuselage, providing for two extra seats, an optional EFIS flight deck, and a choice of either skids or retractable wheeled undercarriage.

The typical configuration seats ten, including a pilot and co-pilot with eight passengers in the main cabin behind them in three rows of seats. Six- and eight-place executive layouts are offered. In an EMS role it can carry one or two stretcher patients with four or three medical attendants, respectively. Maximum external load capacity is 3,500 lb (1,585 kg).

Operational history
The Bell 430 entered service in 1996, with thirteen delivered that year. In 1998, some 50 Bell 430s were in service with 9,000 flight hours totaled.

On September 3, 1996, Americans Ron Bower and John Williams broke the round-the-world helicopter record with the second Bell 430, flying westwards from the UK with a time of 17 days, 6 hours and 14 minutes.

Operators

Military

 Bulgarian Air Force

 Dominican Republic Air Force

 Ecuadorian Navy

Civilian

 Pelita Air

 AirMed
 New York State Police.
 Lee County EMS
 GrandView Aviation
 Louisiana State Police
 Uber Elevate

Accidents
On September 2, 2009, an Andhra Govt. Bell 430 carrying Chief Minister Y. S. Rajasekhara Reddy and his party from Andhra Pradesh in southern India went missing over a local stretch of forest. The charred wreckage was found the next morning, crashed on a hilltop in the Nallamala Hills.

Specifications

Sources: Airliners.net,  helicopterdirect.com,  AircraftOne.com

See also

References

External links

 Bell 430 at Bell Helicopter web site

430
1990s United States helicopters
1990s United States civil utility aircraft
Twin-turbine helicopters
Aircraft first flown in 1994